Intendente is a station on the Green Line of the Lisbon Metro. The station is located in the Almirante Reis Avenue and takes its name from the nearby Largo do Intendente Pina Manique.

History
The station was designed by the architect Denis Gomes with art installations by the painter Maria Keil.

Connections

Urban buses

Carris 
 28E Martim Moniz ⇄ Campo de Ourique (Prazeres)
 208 Cais do Sodré ⇄ Estação Oriente (Interface) (morning service)
 708 Martim Moniz ⇄ Parque das Nações Norte
 734 Martim Moniz ⇄ Estação Santa Apolónia

Aerobus 
 Linha 1 Aeroporto ⇄ Cais do Sodré

See also
 List of Lisbon metro stations

References

External links

Green Line (Lisbon Metro) stations
Railway stations opened in 1966